Edward Józef Szymkowiak (February 13, 1932 – January 28, 1990) was a notable Polish footballer who played as a goalkeeper.

Career
He played for such a clubs like Ruch Chorzów and Legia Warszawa, but most of his career he spent in Polonia Bytom. He is one of the legend of that club. The stadium of Polonia Bytom is called by his name. Szymkowiak participated in the Olympic Games in Helsinki and Rome. He played in one of the biggest victories of Polish football - in the game versus the USSR national football team in 1957.

International

Honours
Ruch Chorzów
 Polish Cup (Polish championship): 1951
 Polish championship: 1952

Legia Warsaw
 Polish championship: 1955, 1956
 Polish Cup: 1955, 1956

Polonia Bytom
 Polish championship: 1962
 UEFA Intertoto Cup: 1965
 International Soccer League: 1965

Individual
 Player of the season: 1957, 1958, 1965, 1966

References

External links
 Profile on bramkarze 
 Profile on legia.net 
 Profile on poloniabytom.com.pl 

1932 births
1990 deaths
Polish footballers
Poland international footballers
Association football goalkeepers
Sportspeople from Katowice
Polonia Bytom players
Legia Warsaw players
Ruch Chorzów players
Olympic footballers of Poland
Footballers at the 1952 Summer Olympics
Footballers at the 1960 Summer Olympics
Polish football managers
Polonia Bytom managers